Antonio "Anthony" Spalliero (July 30, 1942 in Maddaloni – December 19, 2010 in Edison, New Jersey)  was a real estate developer with ties to organized crime. From 1968 to 2005, Spalliero had been arrested at least eight times, and indicted twice, though most of the charges were dismissed or dropped.

References

1942 births
2010 deaths
American gangsters of Italian descent
People from Hazlet, New Jersey
Businesspeople from Newark, New Jersey
Gangsters from Newark, New Jersey
20th-century American businesspeople